Cape Barren Island, officially truwana / Cape Barren Island, is a  island in the Bass Strait, off the north east coast of Tasmania, Australia. It is the second largest island of the Furneaux Group; Flinders Island lies to the north, with the smaller Clarke Island to the south. Mount Munro is probably named after James Munro (c. 1779-1845), a former convict and then sealer, who lived from the 1820s for more than 20 years with several women on nearby Preservation Island.

The island was gazetted as a locality of the Flinders Council in 1968. The population of the island numbered 66 in 2016, most of them in the settlement Cape Barren Island, also called The Corner, on the northwest coast.

Australia's only native goose, the Cape Barren goose, was first documented by European explorers on this island.

History

Sealing is known to have taken place here from 1798 when the 80-ton brig Nautilus (Captain Charles Bishop) arrived from Sydney to commence commercial sealing in Bass Strait. They began operations in Kent’s Bay and took nearly 9000 seal skins that first season. Other vessels followed from Sydney and the United States. Competition between the sealing gangs led to a violent clash between American and British sealers in 1803.

Today the residents of Cape Barren Island consist of an Aboriginal community of approximately 70 people. Most of the residents are descended from a community of mixed descent (European and Aboriginal people) who had originally settled on several smaller nearby islands but relocated to Cape Barren Island in the late 1870s. The Colonial Government of Tasmania established a formal reserve in 1881 and commenced providing basic social services to the community. By 1908 the population had grown to 250 people.

More active government intervention began in 1912 with the passage of the Cape Barren Act. The stated purpose of this act was to encourage the community to become self-sufficient through both incentives and disincentives. Government visits throughout the 1920s and 1930s reported poor health and education and proposals were made to remove children from their parents, ostensibly for their own benefit. Under threat of losing their children many families relocated to mainland Tasmania. By 1944 the population had fallen to 106. From the 1950s the government did indeed remove children from their parents. This forced removal of children was part of a wider policy implemented in many parts of Australia and over a number of decades that resulted in the phenomenon known as the 'stolen generations'. From the 1970s a series of changed government policies were implemented that provided increasingly greater recognition of the personal and social rights of individuals.

On 10 May 2005, the government released Crown lands on both Cape Barren and Clarke Island to be overseen by the local Aboriginal association. This marked the first official handover of Crown land to an Aboriginal community in Tasmania.

East coast lagoons Ramsar site
On 16 November 1982, the east coast lagoons were recognised as being wetlands of international importance by being designated Ramsar site no.256. The site comprises a  complex of shallow, saline lagoons among stretches of coastal dunes and beaches.  It supports various plants of special botanical interest, including nationally rare species, as well as many waterbirds.

Access
Airlines of Tasmania operates a twice-weekly scheduled air service from Launceston. Various charter flight operators offer charter flights from either Tasmania, Australia or Victoria, Australia.

From Flinders Island, Cape Barren island is only a short boat trip away. Cape Barren, with the other islands in the Furneaux Group, are a popular destination for sea kayakers who attempt the crossing of Bass Strait from the Australian mainland at Wilsons Promontory, Victoria to the Tasmanian mainland.

See also

 List of islands of Tasmania

References 

Furneaux Group
Ramsar sites in Australia
Seal hunting
Flinders Island